Tomáš Nuc (born 9 March 1989) is a Czech former football player who played in the Czech First League for SK Sigma Olomouc. He represented his country internationally at under-21 level.

References

External links
 
 
 Guardian Football

1989 births
Living people
Czech footballers
Czech Republic youth international footballers
Czech Republic under-21 international footballers
Czech First League players
SK Sigma Olomouc players
FC Hlučín players
Association football defenders